The Bear River is a river in the U.S. state of Washington. Its upper reach is known as Bear Branch.

Course
The Bear River, or Bear Branch, originates just north of the mouth of the Columbia River in the Bear River Range and Willapa Hills. It flows generally north and west, emptying into the southern end of Willapa Bay.

See also
 List of rivers of Washington

References

External links

Rivers of Washington (state)
Rivers of Pacific County, Washington